Sunchild 202 is an Indian reserve in Alberta. The population in 2006 was 482. The median age of the population 19.6.

References 

Indian reserves in Alberta